José Antonio Páez Herrera (13 June 1790 – 6 May 1873) was a Venezuelan leader who fought against the Spanish Crown for Simón Bolívar during the Venezuelan War of Independence. He later led Venezuela's independence from Gran Colombia.

He dominated the country's politics for most of the next two decades once the country had achieved independence from Gran Colombia, serving either as president of Venezuela (1830–1835; 1839–1843; 1861–1863) or as the power behind puppet presidents. He is considered a prime example of a 19th-century South American caudillo, and imbued the country with a legacy of authoritarian rule that lasted, with few exceptions, until 1958. He lived in Buenos Aires and New York City during his years in exile and died in the latter in 1873.

Biography

Early life
Páez was born in Curpa (now part of Acarigua), Portuguesa State in the Captaincy General of Venezuelapart of the Spanish Empire. His paternal grandmother, Luisa Antonia de Mendoza y Mota, was daughter of Luís Rodríguez de Mendoza, a native of Icod de los Vinos, Tenerife (Canary Island). He was of humble origins, his father being a low level employee of the colonial government. His mother Maria Violante Herrera is said she was born in Quíbor, Lara as 1 of the descendants of Welser German settlers. She had a nickname "La Catira de los ojos azules" (The blue-eyed blonde [The term "catira" is a feminine form of "catire", a  Venezuelan slang of "blond."]) As a boy he was forced to work like a slave. By the age of 20 Páez was married and earning a living by trading cattle.

Late in 1810, he joined a cavalry squadron, led by a former employer, set up with the purpose of fighting the colonial government. In 1813, he asked for leave from his squadron with the intent of setting and leading his own, which he did, joining the Western Republican Army with the rank of sergeant.  Páez had an ingratiating personality which made him very much liked amongst those who knew him. He was also looked up to for his skills as a horseman and for his physical capabilities.

Battles

Páez, a soldier at heart, started moving up the ranks by winning year after year several engagements against the royalists with his band of marauding llaneros (plainsmen). He came to be known by the nicknames of "El Centauro de los Llanos" (The Centaur of the Plains), and "El León de Payara" (The Lion of Payara) or (The Lion of Apure).

Páez had been leading the fighting in the plains while Simón Bolívar was busy with the eastern part of the country. Early in 1818, both men met to discuss better coordination of their efforts. They briefly combined their forces to fight Pablo Morillo. This campaign included an incident wherein Páez and fifty of his men swam on horseback across the alligator-ridden Apure River, seizing fourteen enemy boats in a rare instance of a cavalry attack defeating naval forces.

Páez was soon ordered to go back to the western plains, where he took from the Spanish the city of San Fernando in Apure.

Páez won all of six major battles that he led by himself, the most celebrated one being the Battle of Las Queseras del Medio.

Late in 1820, an armistice had been signed with the Spanish commander and a temporary suspension of hostilities had taken place. However, ongoing developments were making difficult to maintain the armistice and, consequently, it was agreed it would lapse on 28 April 1821.

All five major fighting groups of the Venezuelan army were to start moving towards a central area. Some with the purpose of joining together in one single group and others with the intention of guarding the approach to that region to prevent royalists units from other far away areas from converging and reinforcing the main Spanish army stationed in the same area.

In early June 1821, the 6,500 men republican army was divided and organized in three divisions. The 1st division, made up of 2,500 men, was under Páez's command and formed by two battalions: Bravos de Apure (Apure Braves) and Cazadores Britanicos (British Hunters or as more often translated to English, the British Legions) and seven cavalry regiments.

By 20 June, all three republican divisions converge from different directions in the plain of Carabobo. With the royalists well entrenched in the center and the south, on the morning of 21 June, Páez was given command of an additional cavalry regiment and ordered to take it together with his own division through the hills on the north side and into the plain and to engage the Spanish, while the 2nd division would stay behind Páez and the 3rd would remain in a defensive position waiting to engage the enemy in the center.

On seeing Páez's men move, the Spanish commander, Miguel de la Torre, orders one of his elite battalions, the Burgos, to reinforce and defend the north flank. Initially, the Spanish so fiercely engage the Bravos de Apure battalion that it had to fall back on two occasions. Páez sent his Cazadores Britanicos to help the Bravos and together they fought back the Spanish, now reinforced themselves by two additional battalions. As the fighting intensified, de la Torre sent more troops to the north. Páez then sent his cavalry further north to outflank the Spanish and come down on the plain from behind. At this moment, the battle is obviously going against the Spanish, who in desperation kept sending reinforcements. In the meantime, Páez's men were gaining terrain and closing on falling Spanish from all sides. Some of the Spanish battalions supposed to join and reinforce the engagement in the north, on seeing how their comrades are faring, decide to disobey orders and retreat. As it becomes evident that the republicans were winning the battle, the other divisions moved forward, but by now the bulk of the work had already been done by Páez and his men.

With the Battle of Carabobo, the military fate of the Spanish army in Venezuela was sealed. The victory was carried by Páez. Bolívar promoted him on site to General in Chief of the republican army.

In the battle, the Spanish lost over 65% of their men; the survivors took refuge in the castle of Puerto Cabello. Until it was taken by Páez and his men in 1823, this was the last Spanish stronghold in Venezuela territory.

Politics, La Cosiata

Following the Battle of Carabobo, Páez was named General Commander of the provinces of Caracas and Barinas (at the time they included the important regions of Caracas, Barquisimeto, Barinas and Apure).

It had been Bolivar's dream to unite the liberated Spanish provinces into a single great country: La Gran Colombia. This was made up of present-day Colombia, Venezuela, Ecuador, and Panama. As the war against Spain came to an end, federalist and regionalist sentiments began to arise in these areas.

While Bolívar was engaged in military campaigns in Peru, he was unable to carry on his duties as president of Gran Colombia. As a result, the center of power of the executive branch was in Bogotá under the leadership of Vice President Francisco de Paula Santander, from New Granada (modern-day Colombia and Panama). While some leaders saw Gran Colombia as only a military necessity, others considered it an active administrative entity. Confusion arose between the central government in Bogotá and the provinces and the municipalities.

Páez and some Venezuelan politicians became uncomfortable. In 1826, after the Congress in Santa Fe de Bogotá under Santander found a Venezuelan hero from the independence war guilty of assassinating the French Colonel Emanuel Roergas Serviez in Colombia, Páez initiated and led a movement that became known as "La Cosiata." (This word did not exist in the Spanish language; it was coined to refer to this movement, meaning something along the lines of "that weird thing without a name").

La Cosiata started in April 1826 as a quasi-spontaneous movement (historical interpretations differ) of local politicians and figures supporting Páez. There was pressure in favor of Páez's removal from his office by some locals in Venezuela; they accused him of abusing his authority in relation to implementing orders coming from Bogotá. Páez himself allegedly disagreed with these, which called for the forced recruitment of men for the army. The Congress in Bogotá, including several of the Venezuelans among it, received complaints coming from Venezuela. They alleged that Páez had not properly understood the extent of his orders and had exceeded them in his implementation. Congress decided that it alone could judge Páez for his actions, and ordered him to go to Bogotá for trial.

Páez was initially willing to go. But, some of the local figures who had complained of Paez's actions now felt insulted that their leader was being forced to go to Bogotá to be tried. After a few days of uncertainty and tension in the streets, the municipality of Valencia broke with Bogotá and claimed Páez as military commander. In the following days, leaders of more municipalities followed suit, including Caracas (they had been among the first to accuse him of exceeding his orders.) Other municipalities and local officials did not join in this change of opinion.

In July, Santander declared Páez to be in open rebellion against the central government. While all this was happening, Páez wrote to Bolívar, asking him to come back to take charge and solve the imbroglio.

While Páez and his supporters were willing to have Bolívar as supreme leader, they were reluctant to follow Santander. While they wanted changes to be made to the constitution, they initially wanted to do it under Bolívar as part of the Gran Colombia.

Bolívar, finally returned from his campaigns in the south, took command of the executive towards the end of 1826. He assumed the extraordinary powers granted to him by the Congress. Conflicting letters between Santander and Bolívar, and Bolívar and Páez, created a degree of uncertainty as to what he would do. He finally declared a general amnesty to all those who were involved in La Cosiata. But, he put them on notice that from then on,  any disobedience of his orders would be considered a crime against the state.

Páez welcomed Bolívar and accepted his authority, and Bolívar named him Supreme Civil and Military Commander of Venezuela. This action confused and disappointed both Santander in Bogotá and the few local officials in Venezuela who had not supported the La Cosiata. They were removed or transferred to other posts while those who had backed Páez remained or were promoted.

Until La Cosiata, Páez had been mostly respected as a result of his military successes during the war. From that time, he started to be seen as a politician with the power and the wit needed to pursue and defend any changes, or lack thereof, made under the constitutional order. Páez came out from La Cosiata with more power than he had before.

President

In 1830, Páez declared Venezuela independent from Gran Colombia and became president. Although he was not the first president of Venezuela (which declared its independence from Spain in 1811 and named Cristóbal Mendoza as president), he was the first head of government after the dissolution of Gran Colombia.  From 1830 to 1847, Páez was the most powerful man in Venezuela. He served as president only twice during this time (1830–1835 and 1839–1842), but ruled as the power behind puppet presidents when he was not in office. The government, dominated by the oligarchy, followed a constitution that had largely been written by Páez in 1830. Páez and the conservative oligarchy were conveniently allied because the oligarchy controlled a great amount of the country's wealth but was not popular with the masses, whereas Páez was very much liked by the masses.

Historians consider the period of the 1830s to the 1860s as a golden era in Venezuela's history, in contrast to previous and future dictatorships. But, the constitution was supported by Páez, a military caudillo, and the rule by law was dependent on his personal prestige. Paez generally respected the law and was not interested in personal gain, as demonstrated by the common conditions in which he lived. Between 1830 and 1848 under the power of Páez and the oligarchy, the economic power of the church was broken and its dominance destroyed. From then on, the conflict between church and state ended, unlike in other countries in Latin America.

In 1842, Páez arranged to have the remains of Simón Bolívar repatriated from Santa Marta, Colombia, to the Liberator's hometown of Caracas. His funeral procession was accompanied by exuberant honors before Bolivar's remains were entombed in the Caracas Cathedral.

In 1847 President José Tadeo Monagas, who was put into power by Páez, dispersed the Congress and proclaimed himself dictator.  Páez led a rebellion against him but was defeated by General Santiago Mariño in the 'Battle of the Araguatos', imprisoned, and eventually exiled.

Páez was exiled from the country in 1850 and did not return until 1858. In 1861, Páez returned to power as president and supreme dictator, but ruled for only two years before again returning to exile. During this period, Erastus D. Culver, an attorney and judge from New York, was appointed as American Minister to Venezuela in 1862. He presented himself to Páez, not realizing that the United States did not officially recognize the dictator. He and Culver established amicable relations nonetheless.

Páez lived in New York City during his years in exile.  He returned in 1863 Boarding Pass, living there for another decade before his death in 1873.

Personal life
Páez was married to Dominga Ortiz Orzúa, who served as First Lady of Venezuela from 1830 until 1835, and 1839 until 1843. She was First Lady again from 1861 until 1863.

See also

Presidents of Venezuela
List of presidents of Venezuela
Venezuelan War of Independence

References

Citations
 John A. Crow. 1992. The Epic of Latin America. Fourth Edition. California University Press.
 Thomas E. Skidmore and Peter H. Smith. 2004. Modern Latin America. Sixth Edition. Oxford University Press. (hereafter S&S)
  José Antonio Páez – Official biography.
https://web.archive.org/web/20120305184218/http://elguanche.net/Ficheros3/emigracionytrascendenciaagm8.htm. LA EMIGRACION Y SU TRASCENDENCIA EN LA HISTORIA DEL PUEBLO CANARIO (VIII) (THE Emigration AND ITS SIGNIFICANCE IN THE HISTORY of  CANARY (VIII)) (Accessed on 5 October 2010 at 17:55 (VIII))(In Spanish).

Footnotes

External links

 

|-

|-

Presidents of Venezuela
People of the Venezuelan War of Independence
People of the Federal War
Venezuelan soldiers
People from Portuguesa (state)
1790 births
1873 deaths
Exiled politicians
Venezuelan people of Canarian descent
Conservative Party (Venezuela) politicians
Venezuelan people of Spanish descent
Venezuelan exiles
Burials at the National Pantheon of Venezuela
Venezuelan independence activists